Alfons Serra Fabra (born 10 December 1990) is a Spanish footballer who plays for CE Europa as an attacking midfielder.

Club career
Born in Valls, Tarragona, Catalonia, Serra graduated in Gimnàstic de Tarragona's youth system. After several seasons with the farm team, he made his professional debut on 8 September 2011, in a 0–6 loss against Valladolid, for the season's Copa del Rey.

In August 2013, Serra signed a contract with CE Constància. After featuring regularly, he returned to Pobla in August of the following year.

References

External links

1990 births
Living people
People from Valls
Sportspeople from the Province of Tarragona
Spanish footballers
Footballers from Catalonia
Association football midfielders
Segunda División B players
Tercera División players
CF Pobla de Mafumet footballers
Gimnàstic de Tarragona footballers
UE Cornellà players
Mons Calpe S.C. players
CE Constància players
Arandina CF players
AD Ceuta FC players
CE Europa footballers